The Turan Tovuz 2011–12 season was Turan Tovuz's twentieth Azerbaijan Premier League season. Turan Tovuz started the season under the management of Asgar Abdullayev, but he resigned and was replaced by Afghan Talybov on 12 October 2012. Turan Tovuz ended the season in 11th-place resulting in relegation to the Azerbaijan First Division for the 2013–14 season. They also participated in the 2012–13 Azerbaijan Cup getting knocked out in the second round on penalties to Khazar Lankaran after the game ended 1-1.

Squad

 (on loan from Baku)
 (on loan from Baku)

 (on loan from Baku)

 (on loan from Baku)

Transfers

Summer

In:

Out:

Winter

In:

Out:

Competitions

Azerbaijan Premier League

Results summary

Results by round

Results

League table

Azerbaijan Premier League Relegation Group

Results summary

Results by round

Results

Table

Azerbaijan Cup

Notes
Note 1: Turan Tovuz's game at home to Baku on 10 December was postponed due to a fire at the Tofig Bakhramov Stadium.

Squad statistics

Appearances and goals

|-
|colspan="14"|Players who appeared for Turan Tovuz no longer at the club:

|}

Goal scorers

Disciplinary record

References

Turan
Turan-Tovuz IK seasons